The 2018 Old Dominion Monarchs football team represented Old Dominion University in the 2018 NCAA Division I FBS football season. The Monarchs played their home games at the Foreman Field in Norfolk, Virginia as members of the East Division of Conference USA (C–USA). They were led by tenth-year head coach Bobby Wilder. They finished the season 4–8, 2–6 in C-USA play to finish in a tie for sixth place in the East Division. ODU's streak of home sell-outs (59 total games) ended with the FIU game. ODU had sold out every home since they restarted the football program in 2009.

Previous season
The Monarchs finished the 2017 season 5–7, 3–5 in C-USA play to finish in sixth place.

Preseason

Award watch lists
Listed in the order that they were released

Preseason All-CUSA team
Conference USA released their preseason all-CUSA team on July 16, 2018, with the Monarchs having three players selected.

Defense

Oshane Ximines – DL

Special teams

Isaiah Harper – KR

Darrell Brown – PR

Preseason media poll
Conference USA released their preseason media poll on July 17, 2018, with the Monarchs predicted to finish in sixth place in the East Division.

Schedule

Game summaries

at Liberty

FIU

at Charlotte

Virginia Tech

This marked Old Dominion's first win over a Power Five program in their FBS history.

at East Carolina

at Florida Atlantic

Marshall

at Western Kentucky

Middle Tennessee

North Texas

VMI

at Rice

Players drafted into the NFL

References

Old Dominion
Old Dominion Monarchs football seasons
Old Dominion Monarchs football